Harald Ulrik Sverdrup (29 May 1923 – 26 June 1992) was a Norwegian poet and children's writer. He received several literary prizes, including the Norwegian Critics Prize for Literature, the Mads Wiel Nygaards Endowment, the Dobloug Prize and the Riksmål Society Literature Prize.

Early and personal life
Sverdrup was born in Gravdal, Buksnes, Lofoten, as a son of medical doctor Harald Ulrik Sverdrup (1890–1976) and  Berit Johanne Strandenæs (1896–1961). He was related to bishop and politician Jakob Sverdrup, who was his great-uncle, and to oceanographer Harald Ulrik Sverdrup Jr, who was his first cousin once removed. Other first cousins once removed are Leif Sverdrup, Georg Johan Sverdrup and philologist Jakob Sverdrup. He was also a great-grandson of Harald Ulrik Sverdrup Sr, a grandnephew of Jakob Sverdrup, Georg Sverdrup and Edvard Sverdrup, and a second cousin of historian Jakob Sverdrup.

He spent his early childhood in Lofoten, Risør, Hvitsten and Rjukan, and later in Oslo. During World War II he participated in resistance work in Norway, until he fled to Sweden and Great Britain in 1944. He joined as ground crew at the Norwegian Spitfire Wing, and participated at the war front in Belgium, Holland and Germany.

He was married to Jorunn Elset from 1950 to 1954, and to his first cousin Mari Ulstrup from 1954. The couple lived at Kalbakken and Stokke.

Literary career
Sverdrup made his literary debut in 1948 with the poetry collection . His literary breakthrough came with the collection  from 1958, which earned him the Norwegian Critics Prize for Literature. He issued the collection of children's poetry  in 1958. He received the Mads Wiel Nygaards Endowment in 1959. He received the Dobloug Prize in 1978, and  the Riksmål Society Literature Prize in 1985.

References

1923 births
1992 deaths
People from Vestvågøy
20th-century Norwegian poets
Norwegian male poets
Norwegian children's writers
Norwegian resistance members
Royal Norwegian Air Force personnel of World War II
Dobloug Prize winners
20th-century Norwegian male writers